Ocenebra brevirobusta is a species of sea snail, a marine gastropod mollusk in the family Muricidae, the murex snails or rock snails.

Description

Distribution
This marine species occurs off Morocco.

References

External links
 Houart, R. (2000). New species of Muricidae (Gastropoda) from the northeastern Atlantic and the Mediterranean sea. Zoosystema. 22 (3): 459-469.

Ocenebra
Gastropods described in 2000